Schoolhouse Hollow is a valley in the U.S. state of West Virginia.

A schoolhouse once stood in the valley, hence the name.

References

Landforms of Pocahontas County, West Virginia
Valleys of West Virginia